The Arboretum de Calmels is a small arboretum located on the grounds of the 19th-century Château de Calmels in Lacaune, Tarn, Midi-Pyrénées, France. It contains regional trees such as Aesculus hippocastanum, Juglans regia, and Pinus strobus, as well as exotics including Larix leptolepis and Sequoiadendron.

See also 
 List of botanical gardens in France

References 
 Château de Calmels
 Lacaune: Arboretum de Calmels (French)
 Gralon entry (French)
 Tourisme Tarn: "dans la nature, en forêt", page 26 (French)

Calmels, Arboretum de
Calmels, Arboretum de